Margot Williams is an American botanist who described Hippeastrum iguazuanum in 1984.

Career 
Williams has a master's degree in horticulture and botany, and worked as a horticulturalist and research botanist at the U.S. National Arboretum, where among other activities she worked on Iris breeding.

Publications 
 Williams, Margot 1982. Chromosome Counts for Six Amaryllis Taxa. Plant Life 38: 34–39. [Corrigenda 39: 41(1983)]
 Williams, Margot 1982. A Tetraploid Amaryllis starkii. Plant Life 38: 59-61
 W. L. Ackerman and Margot Williams. New Cold Hardy Camellia Hybrid Selections. American Camellia Yearbook 1981

References

Sources 
 Harvard Botanist Index: Margot Williams
 The Americanization of Japanese iris: at the National Arboretum, breeders strive for longer-lasting blooms in a rainbow of colors. Horticulture, v61, 1983 Feb, p22(4)

Date of birth missing (living people)
Living people
American women botanists
20th-century American botanists
21st-century American botanists
Year of birth missing (living people)
20th-century American women scientists
21st-century American women scientists